Bradley Martis (born 13 July 1998) is a professional footballer who plays as a left-back for IJsselmeervogels. Born in the Netherlands, he represents the Curaçao national football team internationally.

Club career
Martis made his professional debut for Sparta Rotterdam in a 2–1 Eerste Divisie loss to FC Twente on 17 August 2018. On 28 August 2018, Martis signed his first professional contract with Sparta for one year.

International career
Martis made his professional debut for the Curaçao national football team in a 10–0 CONCACAF Nations League win over Grenada on 10 September 2018.

References

External links
 
 

1998 births
Living people
Footballers from The Hague
Curaçao footballers
Curaçao international footballers
Dutch footballers
Dutch people of Curaçao descent
Sparta Rotterdam players
NK Celje players
IJsselmeervogels players
Tweede Divisie players
Eerste Divisie players
Slovenian PrvaLiga players
Association football fullbacks
Curaçao expatriate footballers
Expatriate footballers in Slovenia